Roy Marcus Cohn (February 20, 1927 – August 2, 1986) was an American lawyer and prosecutor who came to prominence for his role as Senator Joseph McCarthy's chief counsel during the Army–McCarthy hearings in 1954, when he assisted McCarthy's investigations of suspected communists. In the late 1970s and during the 1980s, he became a prominent political fixer in New York City. He also represented and mentored the real estate developer and later U.S. president Donald Trump during his early business career.

Cohn was born in The Bronx in New York City and educated at Columbia University. He rose to prominence as a U.S. Department of Justice prosecutor at the espionage trial of Julius and Ethel Rosenberg, where he successfully prosecuted the Rosenbergs leading to their execution in 1953. As a prosecuting chief counsel during the trials, his reputation deteriorated during the late 1950s to late 1970s after McCarthy's downfall.

In 1986, he was disbarred by the Appellate Division of the New York State Supreme Court for unethical conduct after attempting to defraud a dying client by forcing the client to sign a will amendment leaving him his fortune. He died five weeks later from AIDS-related complications, having vehemently denied that he was suffering from HIV.

Early life and education
Born to an affluent Jewish family in the Bronx, New York City, Cohn was the only child of Dora née Marcus (1892–1967) and Judge Albert C. Cohn (1885–1959); his father was an Assistant District Attorney of Bronx County, then appointed as a judge of the Appellate Division of the New York State Supreme Court.  His great-uncle was Joshua Lionel Cowen, the founder and longtime owner of the Lionel Corporation, a manufacturer of toy trains.

Cohn had an unhappy childhood and was taunted by his mother for, in her view, being physically unattractive and mild mannered. Regardless, Cohn and his mother were very close, and Cohn lived with her until her death. When Cohn's father insisted that his son be sent to a summer camp, his mother rented a house near the camp and her presence cast a pall over his experience. In personal interactions, Cohn showed tenderness which was absent from his public persona, but exhibited deeply ingrained vanity and insecurity.

Cohn's maternal grandfather, Joseph S. Marcus, founded the Bank of United States in 1913. The bank failed in 1931 during the Great Depression, and its then-president, Bernie Marcus, Cohn's uncle, was convicted of fraud. Bernie Marcus was imprisoned at Sing Sing, and the young Cohn frequently visited him there.

After attending Horace Mann School and the Fieldston School and completing studies at Columbia College in 1946, Cohn graduated from Columbia Law School at the age of 20.

Early career
After his graduation from law school, Cohn worked as a clerk for the U.S. Attorney for the Southern District of New York for two years. In May 1948, at age 21, he was old enough to be admitted to the state bar. He became an assistant U.S. attorney later that month. 

In 1948, Cohn also became a board member of the American Jewish League Against Communism.

As an Assistant US Attorney, Cohn helped to secure convictions in a number of well-publicized trials of accused Soviet operatives. One of the first began in December 1950 with the prosecution of William Remington, a former Commerce Department employee and member of the War Production Board who had been accused of espionage by KGB defector Elizabeth Bentley. Although an indictment for espionage could not be secured, Remington had denied his longtime membership in the Communist Party USA on two separate occasions and was convicted of perjury in two separate trials.

While working in Saypol's office for the Southern District of New York, Cohn aided in the prosecution of 11 members of the American Communist Party for advocating for the violent overthrow of the US government, under the Smith Act.

Rosenberg trial

Cohn played a prominent role in the 1951 espionage trial of Julius and Ethel Rosenberg. Cohn's direct examination of Ethel's brother, David Greenglass, produced testimony that was central to the Rosenbergs' conviction and subsequent execution. Greenglass testified that he had assisted the espionage activities of his brother in law by acting as a courier of classified documents that had been stolen from the Manhattan Project by Klaus Fuchs. 

Greenglass would later change his story and allege that he committed perjury at the trial in order "to protect himself and his wife, Ruth, and that he was encouraged by the prosecution to do so." Cohn always took great pride in the Rosenberg verdict and claimed to have played an even greater part than his public role. He said in his autobiography that his own influence had led to both Chief Prosecutor Saypol and Judge Irving Kaufman being appointed to the case. Cohn further said that Kaufman imposed the death penalty based on his personal recommendation. Cohn denied, however, participation in any illegal ex parte discussions.

There is now a consensus among historians that Julius Rosenberg was guilty of being a highly valued NKVD spymaster against the United States, but that his trial was marred by prosecutorial misconduct – mainly by Roy Cohn – and that the Rosenbergs should not have been executed. Distilling this consensus, Harvard Law School professor Alan Dershowitz wrote that the Rosenbergs were "guilty – and framed."

Work with Joseph McCarthy

The Rosenberg trial brought the 24-year-old Cohn to the attention of Federal Bureau of Investigation (FBI) director J. Edgar Hoover. With support from Hoover and Cardinal Spellman, Hearst columnist George Sokolsky convinced Joseph McCarthy to hire Cohn as his chief counsel, choosing him over Robert F. Kennedy. Cohn assisted McCarthy's work for the Senate Permanent Subcommittee on Investigations, becoming known for his aggressive questioning of suspected Communists. Cohn preferred not to hold hearings in open forums, which went well with McCarthy's preference for holding "executive sessions" and "off-the-record" sessions away from the Capitol to minimize public scrutiny and to question witnesses with relative impunity. Cohn was given free rein in pursuit of many investigations, with McCarthy joining in only for the more publicized sessions.

Cohn played a major role in McCarthy's anti-Communist hearings. During the Lavender Scare, Cohn and McCarthy attempted to amplify anti-Communist fervor in the country by claiming that Communists overseas had convinced several closeted homosexuals employed by the US federal government to pass on important government secrets in exchange for keeping their sexuality secret. Convinced that the employment of homosexuals was a threat to national security, President Dwight Eisenhower signed an executive order on April 29, 1953, to ban homosexuals from working in the federal government. According to David L. Marcus, Cohn's cousin, many people in Washington who were outed as gay by Cohn and McCarthy killed themselves. As time went on, it became well known that Cohn was himself gay, though he always denied it.

Sokolsky introduced G. David Schine, an anti-Communist propagandist, to Cohn, who invited him to join McCarthy's staff as an unpaid consultant. When Schine was drafted into the US Army in 1953, Cohn made extensive efforts to procure special treatment for him, even threatening to "wreck the Army" if his demands were not met. That conflict, along with McCarthy's claims that there were Communists in the Defense Department, led to the Army–McCarthy hearings of 1954, during which the Army charged Cohn and McCarthy with using improper pressure on Schine's behalf, and McCarthy and Cohn countercharged that the Army was holding Schine "hostage" in an attempt to squelch McCarthy's investigations into Communists in the Army.

The Army-McCarthy hearings ultimately contributed to McCarthy's censure by the Senate later that year. After resigning from McCarthy's staff, Cohn returned to New York and entered private practice as an attorney.

Legal career in New York
After leaving McCarthy, Cohn had a 30-year career as an attorney in New York City. His clients included Donald Trump; New York Yankees baseball club owner George Steinbrenner; Aristotle Onassis; Mafia figures Tony Salerno, Carmine Galante, John Gotti and Mario Gigante; Studio 54 owners Steve Rubell and Ian Schrager (who hosted his birthday there one year – the invitation appearing like a subpoena); the Roman Catholic Archdiocese of New York; Texas financier and philanthropist Shearn Moody, Jr.; and business owner Richard Dupont. Dupont, then 48, was convicted of aggravated harassment and attempted grand larceny for his extreme attempts at coercing further representation by Cohn for a bogus claim to property ownership in a case against the actual owner of 644 Greenwich Street, Manhattan, where Dupont had operated Big Gym, and from where he had been evicted in January 1979. Throughout Cohn's career there were accusations of theft, obstruction, extortion, tax evasion, bribery, blackmail, fraud, perjury, and witness tampering. Cohn was known for his active social life, charitable giving, and combative and loyal personality. His combative personality would often come out in the threatening letters he would send to those who dared to sue his clients.

Political activities 

In the early 1960s Cohn became a board member of the Western Goals Foundation. Although he was registered as a Democrat, Cohn supported most of the Republican presidents of his time and Republicans in major offices across New York. He maintained close ties in conservative political circles, serving as an informal advisor to Richard Nixon and Ronald Reagan. Cohn was also linked to and worked with Democrats such as Ed Koch, Meade Esposito, and John Moran Bailey.  While on the 1980 Reagan campaign, he befriended Roger Stone and introduced him to Donald Trump. Cohn's other clients included retired Harvard Law School professor Alan Dershowitz, who has referenced Cohn as "the quintessential fixer."

Representation of Donald Trump and Rupert Murdoch

In 1971 Donald Trump first undertook large construction projects in Manhattan. In 1973, the Justice Department accused Trump of violating the Fair Housing Act in 39 of his properties.  The government alleged that Trump's corporation quoted different rental terms and conditions and made false "no vacancy" statements to African Americans for apartments it managed in Brooklyn, Queens, and Staten Island. 

Representing Trump, Cohn filed a countersuit against the government for $100 million, asserting that the charges were "irresponsible and baseless." The countersuit was unsuccessful. Trump settled the charges out of court in 1975, saying he was satisfied that the agreement did not "compel the Trump organization to accept persons on welfare as tenants unless as qualified as any other tenant." The corporation was required to send a bi-weekly list of vacancies to the New York Urban League, a civil rights group, and give the league priority for certain locations. In 1978, the Trump Organization was again in court for violating terms of the 1975 settlement; Cohn called the new charges "nothing more than a rehash of complaints by a couple of planted malcontents." Trump denied the charges.

Cohn was allegedly involved in the construction of Trump Tower. Trump Tower was to be built with concrete, however, at the time there was a city-wide Teamster strike and most unions in Manhattan were controlled by or had ties to organized crime. Cohn had represented mobsters in the past like Carmine Galante and Anthony Salerno. Salerno and Paul Castellano at the time controlled the concrete unions in Manhattan and, when Donald Trump needed concrete, he received it from union leader John Cody who was linked to mob boss Castellano.  
 
Rupert Murdoch was a client, and Cohn repeatedly pressured President Ronald Reagan to further Murdoch's interests. He is credited with introducing Trump and Murdoch, in the mid-1970s, marking the beginning of what was to be a long, pivotal association between the two.

Lionel trains
Cohn was the grandnephew of Joshua Lionel Cowen, founder of the Lionel model train company. By 1959, Cowen and his son Lawrence had become involved in a family dispute over control of the company. In October 1959, Cohn and a group of investors stepped in and gained control of the company, having bought 200,000 of the firm's 700,000 shares, which were purchased by his syndicate from the Cowens and on the open market over a three-month period prior to the takeover.

Under Cohn's leadership, Lionel was plagued by declining sales, quality-control problems and huge financial losses. In 1963, Cohn was forced to resign from the company after losing a proxy fight.

Later career and disbarment
Cohn aided Roger Stone in Ronald Reagan's presidential campaign in 1979–1980, helping Stone arrange for John B. Anderson to get the nomination of the Liberal Party of New York, a move that would help split the opposition to Reagan in the state. Stone said Cohn gave him a suitcase that Stone avoided opening and, as instructed by Cohn, dropped it off at the office of a lawyer influential in Liberal Party circles. Reagan carried the state with 46 percent of the vote. Speaking after the statute of limitations for bribery had expired, Stone said, "I paid his law firm. Legal fees. I don't know what he did for the money, but whatever it was, the Liberal Party reached its right conclusion out of a matter of principle."

Cohn had many influential friends. According to Christine Seymour, his long-time switchboard operator, Cohn had frequent phone calls with Nancy Reagan and the former CIA director William Casey, who "called Roy almost daily during [Reagan's] 1st election." Both Casey and Cohn were reportedly close with Craig J. Spence, a high-powered Republican lobbyist known for his extravagant parties. Cohn referred to Donald Trump as his best friend. Cohn told journalists that Trump phoned him 15 to 20 times a day and according to Seymour's notes, Trump was the last person to speak to Cohn on the phone before he died in 1986. Cohn exchanged Christmas gifts with FBI director J. Edgar Hoover; the two also reportedly attended parties with their mutual sponsor and friend, Lewis Rosenstiel, wealthy founder of liquor company Schenley Industries. Cohn also attended events and parties with prominent people such as Margaret Trudeau and Virginia Graham. Cohn dated Barbara Walters in college and remained friends with her. Cohn got to know Alan Dershowitz when they worked together on the Claus von Bülow case and praised Dershowitz's support for Israel. Cohn was a close friend (some said lover) of Cardinal Francis Spellman, and described Generoso Pope as "a second father." Pope's son Generoso Jr. — who would go on to run The National Enquirer— was Cohn's classmate at Horace Mann and so was the heir to the Condé Nast publishing empire, Si Newhouse, another life-long friend.  Cohn was also friends with Norman Mailer, Bianca Jagger, Estée Lauder, William F. Buckley Jr., New York City mayor Abraham Beame and Carmine DeSapio.

Following federal investigations during the 1970s and 1980s, Cohn was charged three times with professional misconduct, including perjury and witness tampering, and he was accused in New York of financial improprieties related to city contracts and private investments. He was acquitted on all charges. Many famous people showed up as character witnesses including Barbara Walters, Firing Line host William F. Buckley Jr., Alan Dershowitz and Donald Trump. In 1986, a five-judge panel of the Appellate Division of the New York State Supreme Court disbarred Cohn for unethical and unprofessional conduct, including misappropriation of clients' funds, lying on a bar application, and pressuring a client to amend his will. That arose from an incident in 1975, when Cohn entered the hospital room of the dying and comatose Lewis Rosenstiel, forced a pen into his hand, and lifted it to the will, in an attempt to make himself and Cathy Frank, Rosenstiel's granddaughter, beneficiaries. The resulting marks were determined in court to be indecipherable and in no way a valid signature.

Sexuality
When Cohn recruited G. David Schine as chief consultant to the McCarthy staff, speculation arose that Schine and Cohn had a sexual relationship. Schine's chauffeur later volunteered to testify that he had seen the two "engaged in homosexual acts" in the back of his limousine, though there was no evidence that Schine ever had any romantic feelings for Cohn. During this period, Schine dated the actress Piper Laurie, and he eventually married a former Miss Universe, producing six children. During the Army–McCarthy hearings, Cohn denied having any "special interest" in Schine or being bound to him "closer than to the ordinary friend". Joseph Welch, the Army's attorney in the hearings, made an apparent reference to Cohn's homosexuality. After asking a witness, at McCarthy's request, if a photo entered as evidence "came from a pixie", he defined "pixie" as "a close relative of a fairy". "Pixie" was a camera-model name at the time; "fairy" is a derogatory term for a homosexual man. The people at the hearing recognized the implication, and found it amusing; Cohn later called the remark "malicious", "wicked", and "indecent".

The young Cohn also attached himself to several older powerful men who, in return, provided Cohn with assistance. One of them was New York's Francis Cardinal Spellman, whose own alleged homosexuality has been a subject of controversy in the Catholic Church. During the years of debate over the passage of New York's first gay rights bill, Cohn would align himself with the Archdiocese of New York and express his conviction that "homosexual teachers are a grave threat to our children". 

Although Cohn always denied his homosexuality in public, he had a few known boyfriends over the course of his life, including his assistant Russell Eldridge, who died from AIDS in 1984, and Peter Fraser, Cohn's partner for the last two years of his life, who was 30 years his junior.

Speculation about Cohn's sexuality intensified following his death from AIDS in 1986. In a 2008 article published in The New Yorker, Jeffrey Toobin quotes Cohn associate Roger Stone: "Roy was not gay. He was a man who liked having sex with men. Gays were weak, effeminate. He always seemed to have these young blond boys around. It just wasn't discussed. He was interested in power and access."

Lavender scare

Cohn and McCarthy targeted government officials and cultural figures not only for suspected Communist sympathies, but also for alleged homosexuality.

McCarthy and Cohn were responsible for the firing of scores of gay men from government employment, and strong-armed many opponents into silence using rumors of their homosexuality. Former U.S. Senator Alan K. Simpson wrote: "The so-called 'Red Scare' has been the main focus of most historians of that period of time. A lesser-known element…and one that harmed far more people was the witch-hunt McCarthy and others conducted against homosexuals."

Sexual blackmail allegations
According to New York attorney John Klotz, who had been investigating Cohn on behalf of his client Richard Dupont, Cohn provided protection for a "ring of pedophiles" operating out of Suite 233 at the Plaza Hotel. The ring, Klotz wrote, had "connections to the intelligence community". 

Some of Cohn's former clients, including Bill Bonanno, son of crime boss Joseph Bonanno, also credit him with having compromising photographs of former FBI director J. Edgar Hoover. Because Hoover knew the pictures existed, Cohn told Bonanno, Hoover feared being blackmailed. Other organized crime figures have corroborated these allegations.

Death 
In 1984, Cohn was diagnosed with AIDS and attempted to keep his condition secret while receiving experimental drug treatment. He participated in clinical trials of AZT, a drug initially synthesized to treat cancer but later developed as the first anti-HIV agent for AIDS patients. He insisted to his dying day that his disease was liver cancer. He died on August 2, 1986, in Bethesda, Maryland, of complications from AIDS, at the age of 59. At death, the IRS seized almost everything he had. One of the things that the IRS did not seize was a pair of diamond cuff links, given to him by his client and friend, Donald Trump.

According to Roger Stone, Cohn's "absolute goal was to die completely broke and owing millions to the IRS. He succeeded in that." He was buried in Union Field Cemetery in Queens, New York. While his tombstone describes him as a lawyer and a patriot, the AIDS Memorial Quilt describes him as "Roy Cohn. Bully. Coward. Victim." It is this latter description that made Tony Kushner interested in Cohn.

Reputation 
In 1978, Ken Auletta wrote in an Esquire profile of Cohn: "He fights his cases as if they were his own. It is war. If he feels his adversary has been unfair, it is war to the death. No white flags. No Mr. Nice Guy. Prospective clients who want to kill their husband, torture a business partner, break the government's legs, hire Roy Cohn. He is a legal executioner—the toughest, meanest, loyalest, vilest, and one of the most brilliant lawyers in America."

Politico writer Michael Kruse wrote of Cohn: "He was preening and combative, look-at-me lavish and loud. It was an act. The truth was he hated what he was—a lawyer who hated lawyers, a Jewish person who hated Jewish people, and a gay person, fiercely closeted if haphazardly hidden, who hated gay people, calling them 'fags'..."

Maureen Dowd wrote in an article for The New York Times which described Matt Tyrnauer's film Where's My Roy Cohn?: "Roy Cohn understood the political value of wrapping himself in the flag. He made good copy. He knew how to manipulate the press and dictate stories to the New York tabloids. He surrounded himself with gorgeous women. There was always something of a nefarious nature going on. He was like a caged animal who would go after you the minute the cage door was opened."

Several people have asserted that Cohn had considerable influence on the Presidency of Donald Trump, e.g. Ivy Meeropol, director of Bully, Coward, Victim: The Story of Roy Cohn said "Cohn really paved the way for Trump and set him up with the right people, introduced him to Paul Manafort and Roger Stone—the people who helped him get to the White House." Where's my Roy Cohn? director Matt Tyrnauer told Esquire that he "was very aware of [Cohn's] relationship with Donald Trump and the fact that he had a huge influence on him. Having done a lot of research and now made a film, I think that that's actually understating it. I think Roy Cohn created a president from beyond the grave".

Vanity Fair'''s Marie Brenner wrote in an article about Cohn's mentorship of Trump: "Cohn—possessed of a keen intellect, unlike Trump—could keep a jury spellbound. When he was indicted for bribery, in 1969, his lawyer suffered a heart attack near the end of the trial. Cohn deftly stepped in and did a seven-hour closing argument—never once referring to a notepad… When Cohn spoke, he would fix you with a hypnotic stare. His eyes were the palest blue, all the more startling because they appeared to protrude from the sides of his head. While Al Pacino's version of Cohn (in Mike Nichols's 2003 HBO adaptation of Tony Kushner's Angels in America) captured Cohn's intensity, it failed to convey his child-like yearning to be liked."

The late Wayne Barrett, who spent dozens of hours interviewing Cohn and Trump beginning in the 70s, told Democracy Now! in 2016: "He was the weirdest guy. He was into the strangest stuff. He was a chicken hawk... yet he was the most virulently anti-gay guy you could imagine. And so, that was Donald's mentor and constant sidekick, who represented all five of the organized crime families in the City of New York."

Media portrayals
A dramatic figure in life, Cohn inspired several fictional portrayals after his death. Probably the best known is in Tony Kushner's Angels in America: A Gay Fantasia on National Themes (1991), which portrays Cohn as a closeted, power-hungry hypocrite haunted by the ghost of Ethel Rosenberg as he denies dying of AIDS. In the initial Broadway production, the role was played by Ron Leibman; in the HBO miniseries (2003), Cohn is played by Al Pacino; and in the 2010 Off-Broadway revival by the Signature Theatre Company in Manhattan, the role was reprised by Frank Wood. Nathan Lane played Cohn in the 2017 Royal National Theatre production and the 2018 Broadway production. Cohn is also a character in Kushner's one-act play, G. David Schine in Hell (1996).  That play may have been inspired in part by the National Lampoon comic strip "Roy Cohn in Hell" (Feb. 1987), which depicts Cohn joining Hoover and Senator McCarthy in the nether regions.

Cohn is portrayed by James Woods in the biographical film Citizen Cohn (1992), by Joe Pantoliano in Robert Kennedy and His Times (1985), by George Wyner in Tail Gunner Joe (1977), and by David Moreland in The X-Files episode "Travelers" (1998), in which an elderly former FBI agent speaks to Agent Fox Mulder about the early years of the McCarthy era and the beginning of the X-Files.

In the early 1990s, Cohn was one of two subjects of Ron Vawter's one-man show Roy Cohn/Jack Smith; his part was written by Gary Indiana.

He was the subject of two 2019 documentaries: Bully, Coward, Victim: The Story of Roy Cohn, directed by Ivy Meeropol (a documentary filmmaker and granddaughter of Julius and Ethel Rosenberg) and Matt Tyrnauer's Where's My Roy Cohn?"Attorney Roland Blum", played by Michael Sheen, is a trickster lawyer, inspired by Cohn, who appears in "The One Inspired by Roy Cohn": Episode 2, Season 3, of The Good Fight'' from CBS Studios (March 2019).

Bibliography

References

Further reading

External links

 1951 Interview
 Discussion with Gore Vidal, 1977
 

1927 births
1986 deaths
New York (state) lawyers
AIDS-related deaths in Maryland
20th-century American biographers
Columbia Law School alumni
Disbarred American lawyers
Donald Trump litigation
Ethical Culture Fieldston School alumni
Horace Mann School alumni
Jewish American attorneys
Julius and Ethel Rosenberg
LGBT conservatism in the United States
LGBT Jews
LGBT lawyers
LGBT people from New York (state)
McCarthyism
New York (state) Democrats
People from Manhattan
United States Senate lawyers
Business career of Donald Trump
Jewish anti-communists
Columbia College (New York) alumni